LHA or LZH is a freeware compression utility and associated file format. A complete rewrite of LHarc, tentatively named LHx, was eventually released as LH. It was then renamed to LHA to avoid conflicting with the then-new MS-DOS 5.0  ("load high") command. The original LHA and its Windows port, LHA32, are no longer in development because Yoshizaki is busy at work.

Although no longer much used in the west, LHA remained popular in Japan until the 2000s. It was used by id Software to compress installation files for their earlier games, including Doom and Quake. Because some versions of LHA have been distributed with source code under the permissive license, LHA has been ported to many operating systems and is still the main archiving format used on the Amiga computer, although it competed with LZX in the mid 1990s. This was due to Aminet, the world's largest archive of Amiga-related software and files, standardising on Stefan Boberg's implementation of LHA for the Amiga.

Microsoft released the Microsoft Compressed (LZH) Folder Add-on, which was designed for the Japanese version of Windows XP. The Japanese version of Windows 7 ships with the LZH folder add-on built-in. Users of non-Japanese versions of Windows 7 Enterprise and Ultimate can also install the LZH folder add-on by installing the optional Japanese language pack from Windows Update.

Compression methods
In an LZH archive, the compression method is stored as a five-byte text string, e.g. . These are the third through seventh bytes of the file.

Canonical LZH
LZARI uses Lempel–Ziv–Storer–Szymanski with arithmetic coding.

lh0
No compression method is applied to the source data.
lh1
This method is introduced in LHarc version 1.
It supports 4 KiB sliding window, with support of maximum 60 bytes of matching length. Dynamic Huffman encoding is used.
lh2
lh1 variant. This method supports 8 KiB sliding window, with support of maximum 256 bytes of matching length. Dynamic Huffman encoding is used.
lh3
lh2 variant with Static Huffman.
lh4, lh5, lh6, lh7
Methods 4, 5, 6, 7 support 4, 8, 32, 64 KiB sliding window respectively, with support of maximum 256 bytes of matching length. Static Huffman encoding is used. lh5 is first introduced in LHarc 2, followed by lh6 in LHA 2.66 (MSDOS), lh7 in LHA 2.67 beta (MSDOS).  LHA itself never compresses into lh4.
lhd
Technically it is not a compression method, but it is used in .LZH archive to indicate that the compressed object is an empty directory.

Joe Jared extensions
Joe Jared extended LZSS to use larger dictionaries.

lh8, lh9, lha, lhb, lhc, lhe
Dictionary (sliding window) sizes are 64, 128, 256, 512, 1024, 2048 KiB respectively.

Jared ported LZH to Atari. The fact that lh8 is the same as lh7 was an oversight. Files using larger numbered methods may as well not exist, as Jared only considers them planned features.

UNLHA32 extensions
UNLHA32.DLL uses its own method for testing purposes.

lhx
It uses 128–256 KiB dictionary.

PMarc extensions
These compression methods are created by PMarc, a CP/M archiver created by Miyo. The archive usually has a .PMA extension.

pc1
PopCom compressed executable archive. Details unknown.
pm0
No compression method is applied to the source data.
pm1
8 KB sliding window, static huffman. Seldom generated, decompressor is reverse-engineered.
pm2
lh5 variant, 4K sliding window.
pms
Used to indicate PMarc self-extracting archive. Should be skipped to reveal the real format.

LArc extensions
LArc uses the same file format as .LZH, but was written by Kazuhiko Miki, Haruhiko Okumura and Ken Masuyama, with extension name ".LZS". The program seems to have come before LZH. It uses a binary search tree in the LZ matching.

lzs
It supports 2 KiB sliding window, with support of maximum 17 bytes of matching length.
lz2
It is similar to lzs, except dictionary size and match length can be changed. 
lz3
Unknown.
lz4
No compression method is applied to the source data.
lz5
It supports 4 KiB sliding window, with support of maximum 17 bytes of matching length.
lz7
lz8
Unknown.

Common implementations appear to only support lzs, lz5, plus the storage-only lz4.

Issues

LHICE/ICE
There are copies of LHICE marked as version 1.14. According to Okumura, LHICE is not written by Yoshizaki.

Y2K11 bug
Because of a bug, DOS time stamps from Level 0 and 1 headers after the year 2011 will be set to 1980, meaning that some utilities need to be patched. This is caused by a bug that interprets the unsigned 7-bit year number bitfield as a 5-bit number. The maximum year should be 2107 instead.

The newer Level 2 and 3 headers use a 32-bit Unix time instead. It suffers from the Year 2038 problem.

Header size
According to Micco, the author of a popular LHA library UNLHA32.DLL, many LHA implementations do not check for the length of LHA file headers when reading the archive. Two problems could emerge from this scenario: a buffer-overrun may occur for naive implementations assuming a 4KB max size from the original specification; antivirus software may skip over files with such large headers and fail to scan for a virus. A similar problem exists with ARJ. Micco reported this problem to Japanese authorities, but they do not consider it a valid vulnerability.

Micco went so far to conclude the development of UNLHA32 and advise people to give up on the format. Nevertheless, they came back in 2017 to fix a DLL hijacking issue.

See also

 List of archive formats
 LZX

References

External links
A history of data compression in Japan
LHA Notes Document about LHA.
jLHA – LHA library for Java
jLHA front-end
LHA for Unix  
Hacking Data Compression  Lesson 11  LZH, LZARI, and LZB
NSRL Magic File contains PMarc info
Explzh Current Windows 7 archiver for LZH/LHA. (Besides LZH it supports RAR, Zip, 7Z, ACE, Tar, Cab & others)
lhasa a cross-platform, open source LHA decompressor (+UNLHA32, PMArc, LArc extensions)
lzh format document describing LZH header format.

Archive formats
Data compression software
File archivers
Amiga
1988 software
Japanese inventions